Telmatobufo australis is a species of frog in the family Calyptocephalellidae. It is endemic to Chile and occurs in the western and eastern slopes of the Chilean Coast Range in Valdivia and Osorno Provinces. Its natural habitats are  fast-flowing streams in temperate Nothofagus forest. It is a rare species threatened by habitat loss that is caused by siltation of streams caused by clear cutting and afforestation with exotic species.

References

Telmatobufo
Endemic fauna of Chile
Amphibians of Chile
Amphibians of Patagonia
Amphibians described in 1972
Taxonomy articles created by Polbot